Paecilaema is a genus of harvestmen in the family Cosmetidae. It was first described by Carl Ludwig Koch in 1839.

References 

Cosmetidae
Harvestman genera
Taxa named by Carl Ludwig Koch